The 2020 Iowa State Cyclones football team represented Iowa State University in the 2020 NCAA Division I FBS football season. The Cyclones competed as members of the Big 12 Conference and were led by fifth-year head coach Matt Campbell. They played their home games at Jack Trice Stadium in Ames, Iowa. Breece Hall became the first unanimous all-American in school history.
After starting the season with a loss to Louisiana, Iowa State won eight out of nine Big 12 Conference games, finishing the season with the best record in the Big 12 and earning a spot in the program's first ever Big 12 Championship Game. Despite falling to Oklahoma, Iowa State was given a bid to the Fiesta Bowl, the Cyclones first ever appearance in a New Year's Six Bowl Game, where they defeated the Oregon Ducks, and due to the COVID 19 shortened season, became one of only eleven teams in the nation to have at least nine wins.

Previous season
The Cyclones finished the 2019 season with an 7–6 record, 5–4 Big 12 play, losing the Camping World Bowl to Notre Dame.

Preseason

Seating plans
On May 26, 2020, Iowa State athletic director Jamie Pollard announced that single-game tickets would not be sold for Iowa State football games for the 2020 season and that only the 30,000 season ticket holders would be permitted to attend games, as a result of the COVID-19 pandemic.

Big 12 media Days
The Big 12 media days were held on July 21–22, 2020 in a virtual format due to the COVID-19 pandemic.

Big 12 media poll

Schedule

Spring game
The Cyclones announced they would spring practices in March and April 2020 and would not be holding a spring game.

Spring practices were cancelled due to the COVID-19 pandemic.

Regular season

Iowa State released its 2020 schedule on October 22, 2019. On July 9, 2020, it was announced that the Big Ten Conference would only play games against conference teams, leading to the cancellation of the September 12 game between Iowa State and Iowa. The Cyclones added Ball State to the schedule to replace in-state rival Iowa. On August 6, 2020, Iowa State's game against UNLV was canceled and rescheduled for the 2030 season. The Cyclones announced a reconfigured schedule on August 12, 2020, with the addition of Louisiana as their non-conference opponent. On December 5, after Oklahoma State and Kansas State lost their respective games, Iowa State officially clinched a spot in their very first Big 12 Championship Game.

Schedule Source:

Roster

Coaching staff

source:

Game summaries

vs. Louisiana

at TCU

vs. No. 18 Oklahoma

vs. Texas Tech

at No. 6 Oklahoma State

at Kansas

vs. Baylor

vs. Kansas State

at No. 17 Texas

vs. West Virginia

vs. No. 10 Oklahoma (Big 12 Championship Game)

vs. No, 25 Oregon (Fiesta Bowl)

Rankings

Awards and honors

Iowa State led all Big 12 schools with nine All-Big 12 first team players.

Hall was a unanimous selection.

Honorable Mention for Individual Big 12 Awards: JaQuan Bailey (Defensive Lineman of the Year), Latrell Bankston (Defensive Newcomer of the Year), Colin  Newell (Offensive Lineman of the Year), Darrell Simmons (Offensive Freshman of the Year) and Rory Walling (Special Teams Player of the Year).

Players drafted into the NFL

TV ratings

All totals via Sports Media Watch. Streaming numbers not included. † - Data not available.

References

Iowa State
Iowa State Cyclones football seasons
Fiesta Bowl champion seasons
Iowa State Cyclones football